John David Albert (May 24, 1810April 24, 1899) was an American mountain man.

Early life
John David Albert was born in Hagerstown, Washington County, Maryland, and was baptized in St. Johns Evangelical Lutheran Church. Albert was orphaned in 1812 around the age of two. His father died in the War of 1812, and his mother soon after, leaving Albert to live with a sister in Harrisburg, Pennsylvania.

Frontiersman
After working on a Mississippi keelboat in 1833, Albert went west in 1834 with a group of approximately sixty hunters to trap. He soon became part of the Western department of the American Fur Company at Fort Laramie. In 1836, he was sent to the South Platte area, where the weather trapped him for the winter on the Cache la Poudre. In the spring, he went to Fort William, later known as Bent's Fort, on the Arkansas River. From March to October 1838 he was employed at Fort Jackson by Peter Sarpy and Henry Fraeb.

He was one of eight to ten mountain men who defended the mill in a siege by approximately 500 Mexicans and Indians during the Taos Revolt. Seeing the approaching mob, Charles Autobees rode to Santa Fe to get help. The remaining mountain men held off the attack into the night, when Albert and Autobees' half brother Thomas Tate Tobin escaped separately on foot in the confusion of the fighting. Albert and Tobin were the only two men to escape Turley's Mill alive. In three days, Albert walked  to the trading post at Pueblo, through winter conditions with no coat, having escaped only with his weapons and shooting bag. Tobin walked to Santa Fe.

John David Albert later settled in the Taos Valley, marrying Juliana Popé, the daughter of William Popé.

He carried mail out of the Spanish Peaks post office at Cuchara station, trapped on the Purgatory and Cucharas rivers, and is credited with building the fort at La Plaza de la Leones.

He was a close friend of Jim Baker, and co-led the parade of Denver's Festival of Mountain and Plain with Baker in 1895.

Death
Albert survived three wives, all of whom were partially or fully Mexican and all of whom died while married to him, and fathered 21 children before his death in Montana. He is buried in the old Catholic Cemetery at Walsenburg, Colorado.

References

 Online book review at Denver Post.

Fort Lewis College Center of Southwest Studies newspaper collection.

Denver Public Library, Western History/Genealogy Department newspaper collection.

Further reading

1810 births
1899 deaths
Mountain men
People from Walsenburg, Colorado
People from Hagerstown, Maryland
People from Taos County, New Mexico
American fur traders
American people of the Mexican–American War
Burials in Colorado
People of the Taos Revolt